

GDP (PPP) estimates for the South Asian region

South Asia relative to the British economy

Republic of India relative to the US economy

References

GDP (PPP) Regions
GDP (PPP)